West Bridgford was an Urban District in Nottinghamshire, England from 1894 to 1974. It was created under the Local Government Act 1894.

It was enlarged in 1935 when the part of the civil parishes of South Wilford and Edwalton were transferred to the district.

The district was abolished in 1974 under the Local Government Act 1972 and combined with the Bingham Rural District and the southern detached part of Basford Rural District to form the new Rushcliffe district.

References

Districts of England created by the Local Government Act 1894
Districts of England abolished by the Local Government Act 1972
History of Nottinghamshire
Urban districts of Nottinghamshire
West Bridgford